The Flyers–Rangers rivalry (also commonly referred to as Broadway versus Broad Street) is one of the most storied and well known rivalries in the National Hockey League. The New York Rangers and the Philadelphia Flyers have met eleven times in the Stanley Cup playoffs, with the Flyers winning six and the Rangers winning five of the series, and they have been division rivals since the  season. The ferocity of the rivalry can also be attributed to the geographic New York–Philadelphia rivalry, which is mirrored in both the National Football League's Eagles–Giants rivalry and the Major League Baseball's Mets–Phillies rivalry.

1970s
In , the Flyers eliminated the Rangers in the Semifinals. The series went seven games, with the Rangers sealing their own fate, taking a too many men penalty in the waning moments of the game while trying to replace the goaltender with an extra attacker. The home team won all seven games of the series as a result, and it marked the first time an expansion team had defeated an Original Six team in a playoff series.

The Flyers went on to win their first of back-to-back Stanley Cups. The day after the Flyers won the Cup, more than two million people—one of them, future Ranger goaltender Mike Richter —lined Broad Street for a ticker-tape parade. Richter grew up in Flourtown, Pa., near Philadelphia, idolizing Flyers goaltender Bernie Parent.

During the 1979 series, the Rangers outscored the Flyers 28–8.

At the end of the 1977–78 season, Shero submitted a letter of resignation stating the Flyers needed a change whether they realized it or not, despite having one more year remaining on his contract. Flyers management had previously heard rumors about Shero wanting to leave Philadelphia and re-join the Rangers organization, and refused to accept his letter of resignation. Shero then signed a $250,000, five-year contract with the Rangers to be their new head coach and general manager, believing he no longer had a contract with the Flyers. A few weeks after signing Shero, the Rangers gave the Flyers their first-round pick in the 1978 draft (Ken Linseman) and cash as compensation, allowing the Rangers to avoid tampering charges.

1980s
The Rangers and Flyers met in the playoffs six times ranging from the 1979–80 to 1986–87 seasons. In 1980, Flyers were the division champions and hosted the Rangers in the second round. They took a commanding 3–0 series lead, New York avoided the sweep, but the Flyers won at home in Game 5 to clinch it. In 1982, the teams met in the first round with the Rangers being the home team. Flyers won the first game, but the remaining three were big wins for the Rangers as they advanced to the next round against their crosstown rivals, the New York Islanders. The next season, Philadelphia hosted the Rangers in the first round. Flyers had a much stronger regular season, finishing with 106 points to the Rangers' 80. However, things went differently in the playoffs. The Rangers defeated the Flyers twice on the road, then came back to New York and routed them 9–3 to complete the sweep. However, they were subsequently eliminated by the Islanders for the third consecutive year. In 1985, Flyers once again won the division and hosted the Rangers in round one. Although the games were close—including Game 1 which went into overtime—the Flyers swept the series. They advanced to the Stanley Cup Finals but lost to the Edmonton Oilers. In 1986, the division-winning Flyers once again hosted the lower-seeded Rangers in the Division Semifinals. This series went back and forth with neither team winning two in a row. The Rangers defeated the Flyers in Game 1, but Flyers tied the series the next day. The series came to New York and Rangers retook the series lead, but Philly annihilated them 7–1 in Game 4 to bring it back home. The Rangers won the decisive Game 5 and advanced. The next season, the pattern repeated itself and Flyers hosted the Rangers in round one again. However, this time the format changed and the first round was a best-of-seven series rather than a best-of-five. All but one of the games was won by three or more goals. The Rangers shut out the Flyers in Game 1, but Flyers came back and won the next two games 8–3 and 3–0 respectively. The Rangers successfully tied the series, but Flyers took the next one at home and shut out the Rangers in Game 6 at Madison Square Garden to advance. The Flyers had another fantastic season and won the conference, but again lost to Edmonton in the finals, this time just one win away from winning the Stanley Cup.

1990s
In June 1992, the Flyers and the Rangers found themselves as the top two bidders for the rights to much-heralded prospect Eric Lindros, who had been drafted first overall by the Quebec Nordiques at the 1991 NHL Entry Draft but did not sign with them because he refused to play for Quebec. On the first day of the 1992 NHL Entry Draft, the Flyers believed they had reached a deal with the Nordiques to acquire Lindros. However, Nordiques president Marcel Aubut reneged on the agreement, saying he had reached a deal with the Rangers instead. The Flyers filed for arbitration and on June 26, the Flyers were awarded Lindros' rights by arbitrator Larry Bertuzzi in exchange for Steve Duchesne, Peter Forsberg, Ron Hextall, Kerry Huffman, Mike Ricci, Chris Simon, the Flyers' first-round draft picks in 1993 and 1994 and $15 million.

The Flyers and Rangers renewed their playoff rivalry once more when the two teams met in the playoffs in 1995 and 1997, both series being won by Philadelphia. The first series was bitter for the Rangers—the Flyers' four-game sweep eliminated the defending Cup champions in the Eastern Conference Semifinals. Many Flyers fans remember this for the second game the Flyers won in overtime. Kevin Haller scored, sending normally laid-back Flyers color analyst Gary Dornhoefer into a frenzy. The latter series was the Eastern Conference Finals that sent the Flyers to the Stanley Cup Finals. With a 4–1 series win, it marked the last time the Rangers would make the playoffs until 2006, and it later turned out to be both Wayne Gretzky's and Mark Messier's last playoff game.

21st century
In August 2001, the Flyers traded Eric Lindros' rights to the Rangers in exchange for Pavel Brendl, Jan Hlavac, Kim Johnsson and a third-round pick in the 2003 NHL Entry Draft. Lindros sat out the  season due to concussion symptoms and a highly publicized feud with Flyers general manager Bobby Clarke.  saw a moment of peace in the rivalry. Just nine days after the terrorist attacks on America, the two teams played a pre-season game in Philadelphia. When the third period was about to begin, President George W. Bush addressed congress and America about the war on terrorism. After his speech, the teams opted not to play the third period, and the game ended in a 2–2 tie; afterwards, the two teams shook hands in a show of respect.

2009–10: Shootout begins Flyers' Cinderella run to Stanley Cup Finals

On December 4, 2009, the Flyers added further heat to the rivalry in firing head coach John Stevens and replacing him with Peter Laviolette. On March 17, 2009, John Tortorella, who had been hired as coach of the Rangers after Tom Renney was fired almost a month before, surpassed Laviolette as the winningest-American born coach. The hiring of Laviolette made the rivalry a battle for the most wins by an American-born head coach.

The Flyers' Cinderella run to the Stanley Cup Finals began on April 11, the final day of the regular season, when they met the Rangers in a winner-take-all match-up for the final playoff spot. Philadelphia defeated New York 2–1 in a historic shootout, the first do or die shootout for a playoff spot in NHL history. The Rangers' Jody Shelley (who signed with the Flyers in the ensuing off-season) scored the first Rangers goal, in the first period, but Matt Carle tied it for the Flyers in the third period to send the game to overtime, then to a shootout. Claude Giroux scored for the Flyers in the first round of the shootout while goaltender Brian Boucher stopped final shooter Olli Jokinen to win the game for the Flyers. With the win, the Flyers eliminated the Rangers from the playoff contention, holding off their late season surge in which they went 7–1–2 to close the season.

In the Finals, the Flyers played the Chicago Blackhawks, losing in six games and losing the deciding game in overtime to give the Blackhawks their first Stanley Cup since 1961. During the run, Flyers left winger James van Riemsdyk told Rich Chere of The Star-Ledger that his earliest memory of the Stanley Cup playoffs came when the Rangers won the 1994 Stanley Cup and watching Mike Richter stop Pavel Bure's penalty shot.

2010–present

In the  season, the Flyers won four of the six meetings against the Rangers and the rivalry was played out three times on NBC, including the meeting on February 20, which was part of the first ever Hockey Day in America (the game was aired in the majority of homes, however people in the Buffalo and Washington markets saw the game between the Washington Capitals and Buffalo Sabres), and again on March 6. The Flyers finished the season 47–23–12 and won their sixth Atlantic Division title, finishing second in the Eastern Conference, while the Rangers, with a record of 44–33–5, finished third in the division, behind the Flyers and the Pittsburgh Penguins, but it took them until the final day of the season to clinch a playoff spot, finishing eighth in the East.

On June 21, 2011, The New York Times reported the Rangers and the Flyers would be playing each other in the 2012 NHL Winter Classic on January 2, 2012, at Citizens Bank Park, the home stadium of the Philadelphia Phillies. The NHL formally announced the event on September 26. The Rangers won the Winter Classic 3–2.

The Rangers went on to win all six meetings with the Flyers in the 2011–12 season. They steadily led the Atlantic Division and won first place in the Eastern Conference in the final meeting between the two teams during the season. In the 2012–13 season, which was shortened due to the lockout, Rangers defeated the Flyers in three out of five regular season meetings. The teams split their regular season series 2–2 in 2013–14. In the 2014 Eastern Conference First Round, the Rangers and Flyers played each other in the first year of the new playoff format. Rangers finished second in the Metropolitan and Flyers finished third. The Rangers' struggles to take a two-game series lead showed themselves once again against the Flyers. They took Game 1 and lost Game 2 at home against Flyers goaltender Ray Emery while their starting goalie Steve Mason was injured. Mason's return came in late in Game 3 when the Rangers had already established a large lead. He would start and finish every remaining game in the series. He played a very solid Game 4 in Philadelphia and gave his Flyers team a good chance to tie the series at two games apiece, which they did. The Rangers took Game 5 at home, while the Flyers Wayne Simmonds scored a hat-trick to help Philadelphia avoid elimination in Game 6 at home. But the Rangers outscored the Flyers 2–1 in a decisive Game 7 to advance to the second round, in which they played the Pittsburgh Penguins, the Flyers' hated rivals. They ended up advancing to the Stanley Cup Finals that year for the first time in two decades.

During the 2014–15 season, the two teams met three times in late November, including the Thanksgiving showdown. The Rangers won all three of these in an 11-day span; backup goaltender Cam Talbot shut out the Flyers in the first two meetings and Henrik Lundqvist stood in net for the third. Flyers won the fourth a final meeting in the second half of the season. The following year the Flyers won each of the first two matchups between the teams: the first one being a 3–2 shootout victory, the second being a 3–0 shutout. The Rangers won the next one in an overtime shootout. The fourth meeting which was in Philadelphia was filled with physical aggressive play from both ends. Wayne Simmons received a game misconduct for punching Rangers' captain Ryan McDonagh in the jaw after the defenseman hit him with a high stick. Several roughing, slashing and fighting penalties were assessed throughout the game, and the Flyers scored a powerplay goal. The Rangers tied the game with their net empty at 2–2 with under 13 seconds remaining in regulation, then won the game in yet another shootout.

Causes
The rivalry stems and attributes to two factors. Both teams are in the same division and the proximity between the cities of New York City and Philadelphia, which are approximately 90 minutes apart by car. The Rangers' fanbase comes from the New York metropolitan area, which includes southern Connecticut, and northern and central New Jersey and the Lower Hudson Valley. Conversely, the Flyers' fanbase generally draws from the Delaware Valley (the Philadelphia metropolitan area), which includes Southeastern Pennsylvania, central New Jersey south of Princeton, southern New Jersey, northern Delaware and extreme northeast parts of Maryland.

The New York City–Philadelphia rivalry is evident in other sports (for example, the Mets–Phillies rivalry in Major League Baseball, Eagles–Giants rivalry in the National Football League), and the New York Red Bulls-Philadelphia Union rivalry in Major League Soccer.

See also
 Mets–Phillies rivalry
 Eagles–Giants rivalry
 National Hockey League rivalries

Notes

References
Inline citations

Bibliography
 
 

National Hockey League rivalries
History of the New York Rangers
History of the Philadelphia Flyers